Robert Maertens (24 January 1930 – 11 January 2003) was a Belgian international footballer who played as a midfielder.

Career
Born in Boom, Maertens played club football for Royal Antwerp and Olympic de Charleroi-Marchienne.

He earned a total of 12 caps for Belgium between 1952 and 1956, and participated at the 1954 FIFA World Cup.

References

External links
 

1930 births
2003 deaths
Belgian footballers
Belgium international footballers
1954 FIFA World Cup players
Belgian football managers
Royal Antwerp F.C. managers
K.R.C. Mechelen managers
Association football midfielders
People from Boom, Belgium
Footballers from Antwerp Province